"You Can't Change Me" is the second single from Roger Sanchez's album First Contact (2001). The song features Armand Van Helden and N'Dea Davenport.

Personnel
 Roger Sanchez – producer
 Armand Van Helden – producer
 N'Dea Davenport – vocals

Charts

References

External links
 Music video on YouTube

2001 singles
Roger Sanchez songs
Armand Van Helden songs
N'Dea Davenport songs
Songs written by Armand Van Helden
Songs written by N'Dea Davenport
2001 songs